Indpur Goenka High School is situated in Indpur, in the District of Bankura, West Bengal, India. It is a 10+2 Capacity school with Arts and Science specialization.

Overview
The school was established in 1930, and re-established by Mohanlal Goenka in 1946. It has about 700 students.

References 

High schools and secondary schools in West Bengal
Schools in Bankura district
1930 establishments in British India
Educational institutions established in 1930